Phrynobatrachus albifer is a species of frog native to Tanzania. It lives near inland fresh water bodies.

References

albifer
Frogs of Africa
Species described in 1924